Everette Ferguson BEM (21 February 1952 – 28 June 2018), better known as Elisha Obed was a Bahamian light middleweight boxer. He is the only professional world boxing champion in history to come from the Bahamas.

Boxing career

Amateur career
Obed entered the amateur ranks at age 12. Fighting almost weekly, he ran up an undefeated record of 46-0 (16 knockouts). At the age of 14, he became a professional boxer.

Professional career
For almost 6 years, he lingered on small promotions on the island of Nassau, in the Bahamas. He was billed as undefeated, but he had lost a fight by knockout to veteran Kid Carew. His loss to Kid Carew was unlisted for almost 8 years, as he was reported incorrectly as undefeated in the press until his loss to Eckhard Dagge.

Veteran trainer and promoter Moe Fleischer travelled to Nassau to "check-out" this upcoming prospect. Mike Dundee, nephew of Angelo Dundee, came in as his manager.

Soon after, Obed was fighting main events. He earned a top ten ranking by knocking out former title contender Bunny Grant. Obed made his U.S. debut in Florida. Knocked out every top middleweight boxer in Florida in the early 1970s, including state Champion Dennis Riggs and former champion Jimmy Williams.

In 1975, he captured the WBC Light Middleweight Title by defeating Miguel de Oliveira. He defended the title twice before losing the belt to Germany's Eckhard Dagge in 1976, after which he quit, claiming he had blurred vision. Obed stated that he had been thumbed in the eye by a Dagge. In actuality, he was later found to have a detached retina and was legally blind in that eye.

Obed decided to enter the middleweight ranks. He later fought Australian Rocky Mattioli for the world championship title but was knocked out in the seventh round. By 27, he was back to where he started from, fighting on local fight cards in Nassau. He retired in 1988.

Professional boxing record

Later life
Obed received a British Empire Medal for services to sport in the 2016 New Year Honours. He passed away on 28 June 2018 after a long illness.

See also
List of world light-middleweight boxing champions

References

External links

 

|-

1952 births
2018 deaths
Bahamian male boxers
Sportspeople from Nassau, Bahamas
Recipients of the British Empire Medal
World light-middleweight boxing champions
World Boxing Council champions